The Jones Girls is the self-titled debut album by American R&B vocal trio The Jones Girls. Released in 1979, it includes the million-selling single, "You Gonna Make Me Love Somebody Else", which charted at number five on the Soul Singles chart, number twelve on the Disco chart and number 38 on the Billboard Hot 100, the latter being their only major chart entry there during their career.

Track listing
"This Feeling's Killing Me" (Charles B. Simmons, Joseph B. Jefferson, Richard Roebuck)  3:30
"You Made Me Love You" (Dexter Wansel, Cynthia Biggs)  4:53 
"Show Love Today" (McKinley Jackson, Shirley Jones, Valorie Jones, Brenda Jones Frazier)  3:52
"You Gonna Make Me Love Somebody Else" (Kenny Gamble, Leon Huff)  5:17
"Life Goes On" (Kenny Gamble, Leon Huff)  4:30
"Who Can I Run To" (Charles B. Simmons, Frank Alstin, Jr, Richard Roebuck)  3:25
"We're A Melody"  (Dexter Wansel, Cynthia Biggs)  5:25 
"I'm At Your Mercy" (Kenny Gamble, Leon Huff)  4:48

Personnel
Shirley Jones - Lead vocals (2, 3, 4, 6, 7, 8), backing vocals
Brenda Jones - Lead vocals (1, 2, 5, 7), backing vocals
Valorie Jones - Lead vocals (2, 7), backing vocals
Dexter Wansel - guitar, keyboards, percussion, synthesizer
Darnell Jordan, Dennis Harris, Herb Smith, Roland Chambers, Ronnie James - guitar
Bruce Hawes, Joseph B. Jefferson, Leon Huff, William Bloom - keyboards
James Williams, Steve Green - bass
Cliff Rudd, Quinton Joseph - drums
Bob Conga, David Cruse, Miguel Fuentes - percussion
Don Renaldo - strings, horns

Charts

Singles

References

External links
 The Jones Girls-The Jones Girls at Discogs

1979 debut albums
The Jones Girls albums
Philadelphia International Records albums
Albums produced by Kenneth Gamble
Albums produced by Leon Huff
Albums recorded at Sigma Sound Studios